Kristina Liščević (born 20 October 1989) is a Serbian handballer for SCM Râmnicu Vâlcea and the Serbian national team.

International honours  
EHF Cup:
Finalist: 2013

World Championship:
Silver Medalist: 2013

Individual awards 
Carpathian Trophy Most Valuable Player: 2011
EHF Champions League Best Hope: 2012
Championnat de France Best Playmaker: 2013
Liga Națională Best Foreign Player: 2020, 2021
All-Star Playmaker of the Liga Națională: 2021

Personal life
She is a sister of Zlatko Liščević.

References

External links

Living people
1989 births
Sportspeople from Sombor
Croats of Vojvodina
Serbian female handball players
Expatriate handball players
Serbian expatriate sportspeople in Denmark
Serbian expatriate sportspeople in France
Serbian expatriate sportspeople in Hungary
Serbian expatriate sportspeople in North Macedonia
Serbian expatriate sportspeople in Romania
Serbian expatriate sportspeople in Russia
SCM Râmnicu Vâlcea (handball) players
Mediterranean Games competitors for Serbia
Competitors at the 2009 Mediterranean Games